Amiri Fahad Sadeeq Kurdi (born 11 September 1991) is a Saudi Arabian professional footballer who plays as a right back for Al-Wehda. He also has Greek citizenship.

Personal life
Kurdi was born in Saudi Arabia to a Saudi Arabian father and Greek mother.

Honours
Al-Ahli
Saudi Pro League: 2015–16
King Cup: 2016
Crown Prince Cup: 2014–15
Saudi Super Cup: 2016

Al-Hilal
Saudi Pro League: 2019–20, 2020–21
King Cup: 2019–20
AFC Champions League: 2019, 2021

References

External links
Insports profile 

1991 births
Living people
Sportspeople from Jeddah
Saudi Arabian footballers
Saudi Arabian people of Greek descent
Greek people of Arab descent
Greek people of Kurdish descent
Panionios F.C. players
Al-Ahli Saudi FC players
Al Hilal SFC players
Al-Wehda Club (Mecca) players
Super League Greece players
Saudi Professional League players
Association football fullbacks
Saudi Arabian people of Kurdish descent
Saudi Arabian expatriate footballers
Saudi Arabian expatriate sportspeople in Greece
Expatriate footballers in Greece